The Andreotti–Norguet formula, first introduced by , is a higher–dimensional analogue of Cauchy integral formula for expressing the derivatives of a holomorphic function. Precisely, this formula express the value of the partial derivative of any multiindex order of a holomorphic function of several variables, in any interior point of a given bounded domain, as a hypersurface integral of the values of the function on the boundary of the domain itself. When considered for functions of  complex variables, it reduces to the ordinary Cauchy formula for the derivative of a holomorphic function: however, when , its integral kernel is not obtainable by simple differentiation of the Bochner–Martinelli kernel.

Historical note

The Andreotti–Norguet formula was first published in the research announcement : however, its full proof was only published later in the paper . In 1977 and 1978, Lev Aizenberg gave still another proof and a generalization of the formula based on the Cauchy–Fantappiè–Leray kernel instead on the Bochner–Martinelli kernel.

The Andreotti–Norguet integral representation formula

Notation
Precisely, it is assumed that

 is a fixed natural number, 
 are complex vectors, 
the iterated Wirtinger derivatives of order  of a given complex valued function  are expressed using the following simplified notation:

The Andreotti–Norguet kernel

where  and

The integral formula

 For every function , every point  and every multiindex , the following integral representation formula holds

See also

Bergman–Weil formula

Notes

References

, revised translation of the 1990 Russian original.
.
.
.
 , .
.
.
,  (ebook).
. Collection of articles dedicated to Giovanni Sansone on the occasion of his eighty-fifth birthday.
. The notes form a course, published by the Accademia Nazionale dei Lincei, held by Martinelli during his stay at the Accademia as "Professore Linceo".

Theorems in complex analysis
Several complex variables